Boxbush is a village in Gloucestershire, England.

References

Villages in Gloucestershire